Belgian Linen is a registered trademark of the Belgian Flax and Linen Association, a trade association that represents over 1,500 artisans and companies that grow and transform flax in Belgium. Since 1960, the association oversees and coordinates the Belgian Linen trademark. There are strict limitations on the use of the label: it has to match a set of quality standards and a certificate can be obtained only by Belgian companies. These standards include that at least 85% of the product by weight contains natural vegetable flax fibres of European Union-origin.

History

1946-1950
During World War 2, flax was a valuable raw material. Due to its strength, the fabric was very convenient for the army (sails for trucks and trains, tents, uniforms,..). After the war, there was a scarcity of flax as the lands were mainly used for the cultivation of food. There was a shortage of flax and the fiber became very expensive. The Belgian linen weavers formed ‘The Federation of Belgian Linen Weavers’. In this way, they could distribute the available flax among each other, and every weaver had the same opportunities. During that period, André Dequae was appointed as secretary, a position he would keep for 40 years.

1950-1970
André Dequae was a native of Kortrijk and belonged to a family of flax cultivators. Later, he was known as a successful politician, with several nominations such as minister in the Belgian government. However, Dequae always kept an eye on the evolution of the flax fiber in the textile market. Partly due to the rise of flax within the Soviet Union, the (European) weavers formed an association to promote themselves internationally. On April 20, 1950, the ‘Confédération Internationale du Lin et du Chanvre’ (CILC) was created. The aim of this confederation was to bring together people of the flax industry from different countries, create guidelines and coordinate the promotion of European linen all over the world. In the same period, the Belgian flax association decided to do the same. Together they set up a ‘Flax Office’ in Brussels. Members of the association: 
 The Belgian Flax Federation
 Flax Exporters Association
 JUTIBELIN (Association of Belgian jute and flax spinners)
 Verbond van Belgische Linnenwevers (Cooperation of Belgian Linen weavers)

1970-1990
By the early 1970s, the flax office had grown into a real organization with several agents worldwide and a head office in Brussels. In New York, there was an office that promoted Belgian flax under the name ‘Belgian Linen Association’. Since then, ‘Belgian Linen’ became a brand name. After the death of Pierre Bodson in the early 1980s, Stefaan Devies took over his function as general manager. In the following years, the Flax Office helped to promote flax through various events. The CICL organized ‘Fil d’OR’, an event that took place several times: in 1985 and 1987 in Monte Carlo and in 1989 in Paris. During this event, young designers were able to compete with each other to participate in a fashion show, attended by international press. The office coordinated the various entries by Belgian and Dutch designers together with the ITCB (Institut de Textile et Confection Belge).

1990-...
In the early 1990s, the European Union provided subsidies for the promotion of European textiles and federations within European countries began to unite. In 1995, the Flax Office ended all promotional activities and the CILC took over this task. That same year, the CILC changed its name to CELC (Conféderation Européenne du Lin et du Chanvre). Under this new name, a label was created for all members: Masters of Linen. Despite the new European label, Belgian Linen remains a reliable reference for processors of linen fabrics. To this day, the label enjoys special status, especially in the United States. The management of the Belgian Linen label remained in the hands of the association behind the Flax Office. In 1999, the Flax Office became the 'Belgian Flax and Linen Association', and its management was transferred to Fedustria.

Belgian Linen
In the United States, Belgian Linen experienced competition from the established label ‘Irish Linen’. This label of the ‘Irish Linen Guild’, the guild of Northern Irish linen weaving, enjoyed a high reputation and was generally regarded as top quality. In order to compete with Irish Linen, the Flax Office opened an office in New York in the 1960s and the Belgian Linen label was promoted. To this day, the label is still highly regarded in the United States.

Logos

Weavers
The following weavers are known to use the Belgian Linen label regularly: 
 Deltracon
 Libeco
 Nelen & Delbeke
 Sofacover
 Verilin
 Weverij Flipts & Dobbels

References

Trade associations based in Belgium
Economy of Belgium
Trade associations